The Old State Mutual Building is an historic commercial building at 240 Main Street in Worcester, Massachusetts. It served as the offices of the State Mutual Life Assurance Company from its construction in 1870 until 1897.  Designed by Boston architect Charles B. Atwood, it is one of a few surviving Second Empire commercial buildings in the city.  The granite building is four stories high, the last of which is under a mansard roof.  It is three window bays wide, with a slightly projecting central bay, which is topped at the third floor by a small pediment.  The bays are divided by Ionic pilasters, and the rooftop is crowned by an iron railing.

The building was listed on the National Register of Historic Places in 1980.

See also
 State Mutual Stadium
National Register of Historic Places listings in northwestern Worcester, Massachusetts
National Register of Historic Places listings in Worcester County, Massachusetts

References

Buildings and structures in Worcester, Massachusetts
Office buildings on the National Register of Historic Places in Massachusetts
Italianate architecture in Massachusetts
Commercial buildings completed in 1870
National Register of Historic Places in Worcester, Massachusetts